Gankhak-e Sheykhi (also Romanized as Gankhak-e Sheykhī; also known as Gankhak-e Sheykhhā) is a village in Kaki Rural District, Kaki District, Dashti County, Bushehr Province, Iran. At the 2006 census, its population was 561, in 114 families.

References 

Populated places in Dashti County